Aikkarappadi (also known as Ayikkarappadi) is a town in the Malappuram district in Kerala, India. Agriculture and education are its main industries.

Aikkarappadi is the main and center town of the Cherukavu village.

Location 
Aikkarappadi is located between the cities of Kozhikode, Kondotty, Malappuram, and Ramanattukara. Calicut/Kozhikode Airport 8 km.calicut university 6 km.kozhikode medical college 16km.
An old traditional family named aykkara became the name of this town.

Agriculture 
Aikkarappadi is home to farms producing rice, bananas, pepper, arecanut, tapioca and coconuts, among others.

Religions 
Aikkarappadi's residents include Hindus, Muslims and Christians.

Worship centers 
 Badar Masjid
 Masjid-ul Furqaan
 Sri Puvvakkatt Siva temple
 Juma Masjid Puthoopadam
 salafi masjid ottupara 
 kalari temple കുറിയേടം ottupara

Education 
 Vennayoor AUPBS Aikkarappadi 
 AMLP School Puthoopadam Aikkarappadi
 Markaz Public School CBSE Aikkarappadi
 School of Commerce and Management Aikkarappadi
 Bharath College Aikkarappadi.
 Badariyya English Medium School Aikkarappadi.
 BTMAMUP School pengad cherukavu

Government facilities 
 Krishi Bhavan Cherukavu village Aikkarappadi
 Veterinary dispensary Aikkarappadi
 Govt. Ayurveda dispensary Aikkarappadi  
 Post office Aikkarappadi
 Mini Stadium Aikkarappadi
 Kinfra Park 2 km, Kakkanchery.
 Akshaya center Aikkarappadi

Transportation 
 Calicut International Airport 8 km
 Calicut Railway Station 20 km
 Feroke Railway Station 8 km
 Beypore Port 13 km

Important roads 
 Palakkad-Malappuram-Kondotty-Aikkarappadi-Ramanattukara-Kozhikkod, NH Palakkad-Kozhikkode
 Aikkarappadi-Kakkanchery(NH Thrissur-Kozhikkod)
 Aikkarappadi-Puthoopadam-KV Kavu-Aroor
 Aikkarappadi-Aroor (bus service available) 
 Aikkarappadi-Chakkamattukunnu, Kaithakkunu

Major industries 
 Zahi Rubbers India Pvt ltd
 Pepsi (old) company

Banking 
 SBT Aikkarappadi
 Cherukavu Vanitha Sahakarana Sankham Bank
 Malappuram District cooperative Bank
 Karshika Grama vikasana bank Aikkarappadi
 Muthoot Fincorp Aikkarappadi

Major political parties 
 CPIM (opposition)
 IUML (Ruling the panchayath)
 Bhartiya Janata Party (BJP)
 Indian National Congress (INC)
 Welfare Party
 PDP
 BSP

Cities and towns in Malappuram district